Bilingualism: Language and Cognition is a quarterly peer-reviewed academic journal of linguistics focusing on the study of multilingualism, including bilingual language competence, perception and production, bilingual language acquisition in children and adults, neurolinguistics of bilingualism (in normal and brain-damaged populations), and non-linguistic cognitive processes in bilinguals. The journal is published by Cambridge University Press and was co-established by François Grosjean in 1998.

Abstracting and indexing 
The journal is abstracted and indexed in:
 Linguistics and Language Behavior Abstracts
 Scopus
 EBSCOhost
 MLA International Bibliography
 Social Sciences Citation Index
 E-psyche
According to the Journal Citation Reports, the journal has a 2017 impact factor of 2.707, ranking it 7th out of 181 journals in the category "Linguistics" and 22nd out of 85 journals in the category "Experimental Psychology".

See also
List of applied linguistics journals

References

External links 
 

Linguistics journals
Publications established in 1998
Cambridge University Press academic journals
English-language journals
Quarterly journals
Works about bilingualism